Crazy Gang may refer to:

 Crazy Gang (football), a nickname for the Wimbledon football team of the 1980s and the 1990s
 Crazy Gang (comedy group), a group of British entertainers formed in the 1930s
 Crazy Gang (comics), a band of Marvel Comics criminals modeled after Alice In Wonderland characters